Yeniceköy is a town in İnegöl district of Bursa Province, Turkey. The population of Yeniceköy was 11359  as of 2012. Although no document exists about the history of the settlement, the ruins of a historical hamam suggest that the history of the town goes back to 15th century. There was a sizeable Armenian population in the past. In the early years of the 20th century migrants from Bulgaria, Greece and Georgia settled in Yeniceköy. In 1956 the settlement was declared a seat of township. Most of the town residents work in the factories around Yeniceköy and İnegöl.

References  

Villages in İnegöl District